The Blue Planet is a British nature documentary series created and produced by the BBC. It premiered on 12 September 2001 in the United Kingdom. It is narrated by David Attenborough.

Described as "the first ever comprehensive series on the natural history of the world's oceans", each of the eight 50-minute episodes examines a different aspect of marine life. The underwater photography included creatures and behaviour that had previously never been filmed.

The series won a number of Emmy and BAFTA TV awards for its music and cinematography. The executive producer was Alastair Fothergill and the music was composed by George Fenton. Attenborough narrated this series before presenting the next in his 'Life' series of programmes, The Life of Mammals (2002), and the same production team created Planet Earth (2006).

A sequel series, Blue Planet II was aired on BBC One in 2017.

Background 
The series took almost five years to make, involving nearly 200 filming locations. The fact that most of the ocean environment remains a mystery presented the production team with many challenges. Besides witnessing some animal behaviours for the first time, the crew also observed some that were new to science. The producers were helped by marine scientists all over the world with state-of-the-art equipment.

Blue whales – whose migration routes were previously unknown – were located by air, after some of the animals had been given temporary radio tags. The camera team spent three years on standby, using a microlight to land on the water nearby when they finally caught up with the creatures in the Gulf of California. The open ocean proved more difficult and over 400 days were spent in often unsuccessful filming trips. After six weeks, the crew chanced upon a school of spinner dolphins, which in turn led them to a shoal of tuna. Off Mexico, the behaviour of a flock of frigatebirds guided the cameramen to a group of sailfish and marlin: the fastest inhabitants of the sea. Near the coast of Natal in South Africa, the team spent two seasons attempting to film the annual sardine run, a huge congregation of predators such as sharks and dolphins, that assembles to feast on the migrating fish by corralling them into "bait balls". Meanwhile, in Monterey Bay, orca were documented attacking gray whales and killing a calf. Filming in the deep ocean required the use of special submersibles. One of them enabled the crew to dive over a mile into the San Diego trench, where the carcass of a 40-ton gray whale had been placed to attract a large variety of scavengers.

When first transmitted on BBC One, over 12 million people watched the series and it regularly achieved an audience share of over 30%.

In 2018 a newly-discovered species of phytoplankton (Syracosphaera azureaplaneta) was named by scientists in honour of the programme, and in recognition of David Attenborough's contribution to promoting wider understanding and awareness of the oceanic environment.

Episodes

Merchandise

DVD and Blu-ray
The series was available as a 3-disc DVD set (BBCDVD1089, released 3 December 2001 and re-released in 2003), including interviews with the production team, a photo gallery and three additional programmes:
 Making Waves: the making of The Blue Planet (50 mins)
 Deep Trouble: an ecological documentary (50 mins)
 Blue: a five-minute theatrical short

The first DVD has now been superseded by a 4-disc Special Edition (BBCDVD1792, released 3 October 2005), which has three extra programmes:
 The Abyss
 Dive to Shark Volcano
 Amazon Abyss

In the US, there is a 4-disc Collector's Set edition (Released 2002), including 8 featurettes, interviews, photo galleries and one additional programmes:
 Deep Trouble: an ecological documentary (50 mins)

In the US, there is also a 5-disc Special Edition (BBC040754, released 6 May 2008). It contains the same features as the US 4-disc versions, but includes a fifth disk containing four special presentations:
 Amazon Abyss: discover an array of creatures living in the Amazon
 Dive to Shark Volcano: venture to Cocoa Island, an underwater volcano
 Beneath the Tides: explore an estuary in winter
 Antarctica

BBC released a 3-disc The Blue Planet: Seas of Life on Blu-ray on 9 April 2013. It contains the featured presentations as well as a third disk containing interviews, behind-the-scenes footage and five special presentations:
 Amazon Abyss
 Dive to Shark Volcano
 Beneath the Tides
 Antarctica
 Deep Trouble.

Books
The accompanying book, The Blue Planet: A Natural History of the Oceans by Andrew Byatt, Alastair Fothergill and Martha Holmes (with a foreword by David Attenborough), was published by BBC Worldwide on 27 September 2001.

The companion volume for the US market of the same book was published by Dorling Kindersley (DK) and released in 2002.

Film 

Deep Blue is a 2003 nature documentary film that is a theatrical version of The Blue Planet. Alastair Fothergill and Andy Byatt are credited as directors, and six cinematographers are also credited. The film was premiered at the San Sebastian Film Festival in Spain on  2003.

Live concert tour 
The Blue Planet was turned into a theatrical presentation entitled The Blue Planet Live! which toured the UK from 2006 to 2008. The UK live shows were presented by World Class Service Ltd. George Fenton conducted the Manchester Camerata Orchestra in Manchester, Newcastle and Nottingham during December 2006, in three critically acclaimed shows. The tour continued in April 2007, again conducted by Fenton, in London, Cardiff, Birmingham and returning to Manchester and Nottingham.

For the show, some of the most spectacular sequences from the series have been edited together and are displayed on a huge screen (18 metres wide and 3 storeys high). The presentation is introduced by a special guest.

The tour continued in April 2008 with dates at Wembley Arena, Nottingham Arena, Manchester Central, Cardiff St. David's and Birmingham Symphony Hall.

The Blue Planet Live! continues to be staged:
 on 7 May 2010 at the Morsani Hall of the Straz Center for the Performing Arts in Tampa, Florida performed by the Florida Orchestra and conducted by Ward Stare.
 in July 2011 in the Mann Center for the Performing Arts in Philadelphia performed by the Russian National Orchestra, narrator Jane Pauley
 in June 2012 in Singapore performed by the Singapore Symphony Orchestra
 in December 2014 in Abu Dhabi at Corniche performed by the National Symphony Orchestra
 on 22 January 2015 in London at Royal Festival Hall, as a part of the Philharmonia at the Movies series.

Sequel

In February 2017, the BBC announced a seven-part sequel had been commissioned, titled Blue Planet II, with Sir David Attenborough returning as narrator and presenter. The sequel debuted on BBC One, BBC One HD and BBC Earth channel on 29 October 2017.

Overseas 
The series was sold to over 50 countries. In the United States, it was shown as The Blue Planet: Seas of Life with the episodes in a different order, the first one being retitled "Ocean World". The series was shown on the Discovery Channel and was narrated by Pierce Brosnan.

Awards and nominations

Criticism 
The series attracted some criticism when it was revealed that some of the footage was filmed at an aquarium in Wales. The series producer, Alastair Fothergill, said that around 2% of the whole series was filmed in tanks at aquariums. A BBC spokesman argued that it would've been unethical to actually disturb the breeding process of wild lobsters for one of the scenes, which was why they made the decision to use the aquarium footage.

References

External links 

 
 The Blue Planet at BBC Earth
 The Blue Planet at Hulu
 The Blue Planet on the Eden website
 Discovery Channel's Blue Planet homepage
 Simon King, Cameraman
 
 

2000s British documentary television series
2001 British television series debuts
2001 British television series endings
BBC television documentaries
Documentary films about marine biology
Discovery Channel original programming
Television series by BBC Studios